George Black  (April 10, 1873 – August 23, 1965) was an administrator and politician in Yukon, Canada. He went to Yukon in 1898 during the Gold Rush and prospected for gold, making a fortune and losing it when his claim was swept away in a flood. He then established a law practice in Dawson City. He was elected to the Yukon Territorial Council in 1905, and first ran for the House of Commons of Canada in the 1908 federal election but was defeated.

In the 1911 federal election he was H.H. Stevens' campaign manager, and was rewarded by the government of Robert Laird Borden by being appointed to the position of Commissioner of the Yukon. As the commissioner from 1912 to 1915, he tried to bring in legislation to protect miners, loggers and others who worked for companies that went bankrupt.

During World War I, Black recruited a regiment from the Yukon to fight in the war. He became the company's Captain, and was later wounded in combat at the Battle of Amiens.

Following the war, he settled in British Columbia in 1919, and ran unsuccessfully for a seat in the Legislative Assembly of British Columbia.

He first won a seat in Parliament in the 1921 election as a Conservative, representing Yukon. As a Member of Parliament (MP), he introduced legislation to give Yukoners the right to trial by jury and to protect mining titles.

After the Tories won the 1930 election, the new Prime Minister of Canada, R.B. Bennett, nominated Black to be Speaker of the House of Commons of Canada. As Speaker, he kept a .22 caliber pistol in his chambers which he used to shoot rabbits on Parliament Hill. Black's personal and financial life were strained during the Great Depression and he had a nervous breakdown. He was committed to the Westminster Veterans Hospital in London, Ontario for 6 months. Being unavailable to preside over the final session of the 17th Parliament, he resigned prior to its commencement in January 1935. Since Black was unfit to run in the 1935 election his wife, Martha Black, ran in his place as an "Independent Conservative". She held the seat, becoming the second woman elected to the House of Commons (the first being Agnes Macphail), and the first American-born woman to do so.

Black was released from hospital in July 1935, and moved to Vancouver to recuperate. Martha stepped aside, and allowed Black to run for the Yukon seat in the 1940 election. In the 1945 election the Liberal riding association was concerned that Communist union organizer Tom McEwen of the Labor-Progressive Party could win the election and opted not to run a candidate in Yukon riding and instead supported Black against the Communists and the Co-operative Commonwealth Federation. The local unions supported McEwen and the LPP's platform of support for collective bargaining, family allowance, old age pensions, workers’ compensation and equality for "Indians and Eskimos." Black campaigned on a more left wing platform, promising collective bargaining, minimum wages, maximum-hour and minimum-age laws, paid holidays, unemployment insurance and labour representation on government boards and  defeated McEwan by a margin of 162 votes. He remained in Parliament until the 1949 election, which he did not contest. He attempted to recapture his seat in the 1953 election but was unsuccessful.

References

 

1873 births
1965 deaths
Speakers of the House of Commons of Canada
People of the Klondike Gold Rush
20th-century Canadian lawyers
Members of the King's Privy Council for Canada
Members of the House of Commons of Canada from Yukon
Conservative Party of Canada (1867–1942) MPs
Commissioners of Yukon
People from Dawson City
People from Woodstock, New Brunswick
Members of the Yukon Territorial Council